The Best American Short Stories 1997, a volume in The Best American Short Stories series, was edited by Katrina Kennison and by guest editor E. Annie Proulx.  This was the first and only year that the stories were formally grouped by category, rather than alphabetically.

Short stories included

Category:  Manners and Right Behavior

Category:  Identifying the Stranger

Category:  Perceived Social Values

Category:  Rites of Passage

References

1997 anthologies
Fiction anthologies
Short Stories 1997
Houghton Mifflin books